Harun Farocki (9 January 1944 – 30 July 2014) was a German filmmaker, author, and lecturer in film.

Early life and education
Farocki was born as Harun El Usman Faroqhi in Neutitschein, which is now Nový Jičín in the Czech Republic. His father, Abdul Qudus Faroqui, had immigrated to Germany from India in the 1920s. His German mother had been evacuated from Berlin due to the Allied bombing of Germany. He simplified the spelling of his surname as a young man. After World War II Farocki grew up in India and Indonesia before the family resettled in Hamburg in 1958.

Farocki, who was deeply influenced by Bertolt Brecht and Jean-Luc Godard, studied at the German Film and Television Academy Berlin (dffb) from 1966 to 1968. He began making films – from the very beginning, they were non-narrative essays on the politics of imagery – in the mid-1960s. From 1974 to 1984, when its publication ceased, he edited the magazine Filmkritik.
  
From 1993 to 1999, Farocki taught at the University of California, Berkeley. He later was a professor at the Academy of Fine Arts Vienna.
He died unexpectedly on 30 July 2014, aged 70.

Work
He made over 90 films, the vast majority of them short experimental documentaries. 

In his 2000-2003 three-part installation, Eye/Machine, Farocki coined the term "operational image".

Farocki's work was included in the 2004–05 Carnegie International at the Carnegie Museum of Art in Pittsburgh. Pennsylvania.

A first major UK retrospective of his films was held at Tate Modern in 2009. 

The 2011 exhibition "Harun Farocki: Images of War (at a Distance)" at the Museum of Modern Art was the first comprehensive solo exhibition of Farocki's work in a U.S. museum.

Films (selection) 
(D = Director, E = Editor, S = Screenplay, P = Production, A = Actor)

1969: Die Worte des Vorsitzenden - The Words of The Chairman
1969: Nicht löschbares Feuer - Inextinguishable Fire (Short, D)
1970: Die Teilung aller Tage - The Division of All Days (D, E, S) 
1971: Eine Sache, die sich versteht (D, S, P)
1975: Auf Biegen oder Brechen (S)
1978: Zwischen zwei Kriegen (Between Two Wars) (D, E, S, P) - Himself / narrator
1979: Ich räume auf (A) - Herausgeber
1980: Henry Angst (A)
1981: Etwas wird sichtbar (A)
1981: Etwas wird sichtbar - Before Your Eyes Vietnam (D, S, P)
1983: Ein Bild - An Image
1983: Jean-Marie Straub and Danièle Huillet (at work on Franz Kafka's "Amerika")
1984: Klassenverhältnisse (Straub-Huillet's) (A) - Delamarche
1985: Betrogen (Betrayed) (D, S)
1986: Wie man sieht (As You See) (D, S, P)
1987: Bilderkrieg (D)
1987: Die Schulung1989: Bilder der Welt und Inschrift des Krieges (Images of the World and the Inscription of War) (D, S, P)
1990: Leben: BRD - How to live in the Federal Republic of Germany (D, S, P)
1991: Videogramme einer Revolution (Videograms of a Revolution) (D, S, P)
1993: Was ist los? - What's up? (D, S) 
1994: Die Umschulung1995: Arbeiter verlassen die Fabrik (Workers Leaving the Factory)
1995: Schnittstelle1996: Die Bewerbung - The Interview (TV) (D, S)
1996: Der Auftritt - The Appearance1997: Stilleben - Still Life (D, S)
1997: Nach dem Spiel (P)
1998: Worte und Spiele2000: Die innere Sicherheit - The State I Am In (S)
2000: Gefängnisbilder (Prison Images) (D, S)
2001: Auge/Maschine2001: Die Schöpfer der Einkaufswelten - The Creators of the Shopping Worlds (D, S)
2003: Erkennen und Verfolgen (D, S, P)
2004: Nicht ohne Risiko (D, S, P)
2005: Die Hochzeitsfabrik (P)
2005: Ghosts (S)
2006: Am Rand der Städte (P)
2007: Aufschub
2007: Respite - first episode of Memories (Jeonju Digital Project 2007) 
2009: Zum Vergleich (D, S)
2009-2010: Serious Games I-IV Video series
2012: Barbara (S)
2014: Phoenix (S)

DVD 
Images of the world and the inscription of war and Respite were released on Region 0 DVD on 7 June 2011 by Survivance.

Personal life
Farocki's first wife, Ursula Lefkes, whom he married in 1966, died in 1996. His survivors include his second wife, Antje Ehmann, whom he married in 2001; twin daughters from his first marriage, Annabel Lee and Larissa Lu; and eight grandchildren.

References

External links 
 Harun Farocki Official site
 
 Harun Farocki in the Video Data Bank
 'Harun Farocki. Empathy', Exhibition at Fundació Antoni Tàpies, Barcelona
 Vídeo of the talk by Antje Ehmann about the Harun Farocky's work 'Labour in a Single Shot' at Fundació Antoni Tàpies museum, Barcelona, 2016

Academic articles 
 Embodied histories. Harun Farocki and Andrei Ujică's Videograms of a Revolution.
 Pantenburg, Volker: Farocki/Godard: Film as Theory. Amsterdam: Amsterdam University Press 2015.

1944 births
2014 deaths
People from Nový Jičín
Indian people of German descent
german experimental filmmakers
German documentary filmmakers
German people of Indian descent
Moravian-German people